The Promise is the sixth studio album by singer/songwriter Bif Naked, released in 2009.

Track listing
Unless otherwise noted, all songs composed by Bif Naked and Jason Darr.
"Crash and Burn" – 3:33
"Sick" – 3:40
"Bluejay" – 3:54
"Fuck You 2" (Jason Darr) – 3:14
"Honeybee" – 2:53
"You'll Never Know" (Jason Darr/Brian Howes/Jacen Ekstrom/Mike Sweeney/Jamie Warren) – 2:53
"My Innocence" (Bif Naked/Curt Frasca/Sabelle Breer) – 3:28
"Red Flag" (Bif Naked/Peter Karroll/Doug Fury) – 3:26
"Ciao, Bella" – 4:05
"King of Karma" (Bif Naked/Peter Karroll/Doug Fury) – 3:14
"Amazon Motel" (Bif Naked/Peter Karroll/Doug Fury) – 3:43
"River of Fire" – 3:45
"Welcome to the End" (Bif Naked/Peter Karroll/Doug Fury) – 3:58
"Save Your Breath" 3:04 (digital download edition bonus track)

Personnel
Bif Naked - Vocals
Jason Darr - Guitars and programming
Hansel Funke - Bass
Locutis - Drums
John Webster - Additional Keys

References

External links

2009 albums
Bif Naked albums